Yana Ranra (Quechua yana black, ranra stony; stony ground, "black stony ground", also spelled Yanarangra) is a mountain in the La Raya mountain range in the Andes of Peru, about  high. It is located in the Cusco Region, Canas Province, Layo District, and in the Canchis Province, Marangani District. Yana Ranra lies near the La Raya pass northwest of Chimpulla and Kunka and southwest of Huch'uy K'uchu. It is situated at the Hatun K'uchu valley ("big corner", Atuncucho) whose stream flows to the Willkanuta River.

References

Mountains of Cusco Region
Mountains of Peru